Pat McGuire may refer to:

Pat McGuire (politician), member of the Illinois State Senate
Patricia McGuire (born 1952), president of Trinity Washington University
Pat McGuire (baseball) in 1988 Atlantic Coast Conference baseball tournament
Pat McGuire (wrestler), see Future of Wrestling
Pat McGuire (footballer), English footballer

See also
Patrick McGuire (disambiguation)